Takaneh may refer to:
 Takaneh, Kermanshah (تاكانه - Tākāneh)
 Takaneh, Lorestan (تكانه - Takāneh)